The 2018–19 Macedonian Second Football League was the 27th season of the Macedonian Second Football League, the second division in the Macedonian football league system. The season began on 18 August 2018 and concluded on 
25 May 2019.

East

Participating teams

League table

Results

Matches 1–18

Matches 19–27

West

Participating teams

League table

Results

Matches 1–18

Matches 19–27

Promotion play-off

Semi-final

Final

See also
2018–19 Macedonian Football Cup
2018–19 Macedonian First Football League
2018–19 Macedonian Third Football League

References

External links
Football Federation of Macedonia 
MacedonianFootball.com 

North Macedonia 2
2
Macedonian Second Football League seasons